The 2022 IBG Prague Open was a professional tennis tournament played on clay courts. It was part of the 2022 ATP Challenger Tour. It took place in Prague, Czech Republic between 22 and 28 August 2022.

Singles main-draw entrants

Seeds 

 1 Rankings as of 15 August 2022.

Other entrants 
The following players received wildcards into the singles main draw:
  Jakub Menšík
  Petr Nouza
  Matěj Vocel

The following player received entry into the singles main draw as an alternate:
  Marek Gengel

The following players received entry from the qualifying draw:
  Victor Vlad Cornea
  Martín Cuevas
  João Domingues
  Martin Krumich
  Adrián Menéndez Maceiras
  Michael Vrbenský

Champions

Singles 

  Oleksii Krutykh def.  Lucas Gerch 6–3, 6–7(2–7), 6–2.

Doubles 

  Victor Vlad Cornea /  Andrew Paulson def.  Adrian Andreev /  Murkel Dellien 6–3, 6–1.

References

2022 ATP Challenger Tour
August 2022 sports events in the Czech Republic
IBG Prague Open